Longford Park is a public park in Stretford, Greater Manchester. It is in the east of the town and spans an area of 22 ha, making it the largest park in Trafford Borough.

Attractions include a pets' corner, a wildlife garden, bowling greens, tennis and basketball courts, a play area for children, a Scout group, disc golf course, and an athletics stadium. It was the site of a royal garden party in 1977, the Silver Jubilee of Elizabeth II. As the Manchester–Stretford border ran across the park until the Boundary Commission moved it in 1987, part of it (including Stretford Stadium) was in Chorlton-cum-Hardy, although it was always administered by Trafford Council.

History

Longford Park was the home of industrialist John Rylands, industrialist and philanthropist  from 1855 until his death in 1888 and of his widow Enriqueta Augustina Rylands until her death in 1908. The house Rylands constructed in the park in 1857, Longford Hall, was demolished in 1995. It replaced an earlier house of the same name that had been the residence of cotton merchant Thomas Walker (died 1817) and subsequently of his sons Thomas (died 1836) and Charles. Today only the front porch, coach house, and the stable buildings remain. The estate and hall were sold to Stretford Council in 1911 after a poll of ratepayers, and the park was opened to the public the following year.

1st Stretford (Longford) Scout Group, who are one of the oldest Scout Groups in the UK, are based within the Shippon Complex which they call the Ranche.

Longford Park is the home of Stretford parkrun; a free, weekly 5k running event.

References

Parks and commons in Trafford
Stretford